Comal County Blue is Jason Boland & The Stragglers's sixth album. It was released in August 2008. The album is dedicated to Bob Childers and Jerry "Uncle Stoney" Newport. It is the third album by the band to be produced by Lloyd Maines. The album features a duet with Texas singer/songwriter, Robert Earl Keen, entitled "The Party's Not Over." The tenth track was co-written with Cody Canada of Cross Canadian Ragweed and is recorded on the band's 1998 album, Carney. The last track on the album is a version of the song, "Outlaw Band," written by Bob Childers and Randy Crouch.

Jennifer Webb of About.com gave the album 4.5 stars out of 5.

Track listing
"Sons And Daughters Of Dixie" (Jason Boland) - 3:49
"Down Here On Earth" (Boland) - 3:05
"Comal County Blue" (Boland) - 4:02
"Something You Don't See Everyday" (Boland) - 4:04
"Bottle By My Bed" (Boland) - 5:14
"The Party's Not Over" ft. Robert Earl Keen (Boland, Roger Ray) - 3:46
"If It Were Up To Me" (Boland) - 3:56
"May Not Be Love" (Boland) - 3:43
"No Reason Being Late" (Boland, Johnny Burke) - 3:12
"Alright" (Boland, Cody Canada) - 3:05
"God Is Mad At Me" (Boland, Jackson Taylor) - 4:12
"Outlaw Band" (Bob Childers, Randy Crouch, Layle Stagner) - 5:04

Personnel
Jason Boland - Vocals, Acoustic Guitar
Roger Ray - Lead Guitar, Pedal Steel, Lap Steel, 12 String, Dobro
Grant Tracy - Bass, Harmony Vocals
Brad Rice - Drums, Djembe (Jimbay)
Noah Jeffries - Banjo, Fiddle, Mandolin
Lloyd Maines - Acoustic Guitar, Baritone Guitar
John Micael Whitby - B3 Organ, Piano
Drew Womack - Harmony Vocals
Robert Earl Keen - Vocals
Jessica Murray - Harmony Vocals

Chart performance

References 

Jason Boland & The Stragglers albums
2008 albums